Amarillo Records was an independent record label owned by Gregg Turkington that operated out of San Francisco, California, from 1992 to 2001.  The label specialized in releasing experimental rock music and comedy records. It released several solo recordings by Church Of Satan founder Anton LaVey the 1996 sampler compilation You Gan't Boar Like an Eabla When You Work with Turkrys.

Artists on Amarillo Records

A list of bands, artists and others whose music, spoken word and comedy released through Amarillo Records.

Anton LaVey
Charles Gocher
Dieselhed
Faxed Head
Harvey Sid Fisher
Heavenly Ten Stems
Major Entertainer Mike H
Neil Hamburger
New Session People
Pop-O-Pies
Secret Chiefs 3
Sun City Girls
Therapist John's Zip Code Revue
Thinking Fellers Union Local 282
Three Doctors (band)|Three Doctors
Today's Sounds
Totem Pole Of Losers
U.S. Saucer
Zip Code Rapists
Zip Code Revue

See also
 List of record labels

References

Defunct record labels of the United States
Alternative rock record labels
1992 establishments in California
2001 disestablishments in California
Companies based in San Francisco